Joseph Benjamin Noil (1841 – March 21, 1882) was a United States Navy sailor and a recipient of America's highest military decoration—the Medal of Honor.

Military service
Joseph B. Noil enlisted in the Navy from New York; when he re-enlisted for three years on December 29, 1874, he was described as thirty-four years old, born in Nova Scotia and of African descent. His civilian occupation was as a caulker, and he was five feet, six inches tall.

For his conduct on this occasion, he was awarded the Medal of Honor.

About a week later, he was transferred to Saint Elizabeth's Hospital in Washington, D.C., where he died on March 21, 1882, and was buried in the hospital graveyard under the name of "Joseph B. Noel". His grave was re-discovered in 2011 by the Medal of Honor Historical Society of the United States, a group that has a mission to identify and photograph the "lost" resting places of Medal of Honor recipients. A new headstone, noting that Noil is a Medal of Honor recipient, was dedicated in April 2016, in a ceremony attended by representatives from the Canadian Embassy in Washington and by Noil's great-great-great granddaughter.

Medal of Honor citation
Rank and organization: Seaman, U.S. Navy. Born: 1841, Nova Scotia. Accredited to: New York.

Citation:

Serving on board the U.S.S. Powhatan at Norfolk, 26 December 1872, Noil saved Boatswain J. C. Walton from drowning.

Personal life
Noil married Sarah Jane Gambier (1846 – March 6, 1896) of New York City; they had two daughters, Florence Gambier Noil (October 1871 – October 5, 1933) and Sarah Elizabeth Noil (b. January 13, 1876, date of death unknown).

His granddaughter, Cora Hunter Parks, was an actress, dancer, and vaudeville artist who appeared in a number of Broadway shows. As a member of the group The Rhythmettes, she sang "Optimistic Voices" in the 1939 movie The Wizard of Oz, and on Broadway in 1939, again with the Rhythmettes, with Louis Armstrong, Moms Mabley, Oscar Polk and others, she sang and danced in the show Swingin' the Dream.

See also
List of Medal of Honor recipients during peacetime
List of African American Medal of Honor recipients
List of foreign-born Medal of Honor recipients
Military history of Nova Scotia
Black Nova Scotians

References

1841 births
1881 deaths
Canadian emigrants to the United States
United States Navy Medal of Honor recipients
United States Navy sailors
People from Queens County, Nova Scotia
Canadian-born Medal of Honor recipients
Non-combat recipients of the Medal of Honor